FK CSM Tisovec is a Slovak football team, based in the town of Tisovec. The club was founded in 1912.

External links 
Official Tisovec website

Club history 
The greatest club success are, if FK Tisovec fought the promotion to 2nd Slovak competition (divisions) in Slovakia, in 2009/2010 season fought the promotion to Slovak Third League.
The club played two memories matches against Slovan Bratislava (1944) and Slavia Prague (1947). In this time, Czech-Austrian international footballer Josef Bican played for Slavia.

Club colours 
Club colours are blue - yellow.

References

Football clubs in Slovakia
Association football clubs established in 1912
1912 establishments in Slovakia